Bronllys Hospital is a heath facility in Bronllys, Wales. It is managed by Powys Teaching Health Board. The Basil Webb Hall and the Chapel are Grade II listed buildings.
The hospital grounds are listed Grade II on the Cadw/ICOMOS Register of Parks and Gardens of Special Historic Interest in Wales.

History
The hospital was established as a tuberculosis facility known as the South Wales Sanitorium. It was designed by Edwin Thomas Hall and Stanley Hall in the arts and crafts style and was opened by King George V and Queen Mary in 1920. The chapel, which was a gift from Sir David Llewellyn and Lord Buckland, opened at the same time. The hospital joined the National Health Service in 1948. One of the buildings, Glasbury House, is now the headquarters of Powys Teaching Health Board and it was announced in February 2015 that Llewellyn Ward would remain open with GP support.

References

Hospitals in Powys
Registered historic parks and gardens in Powys
Hospitals established in 1920
1920 establishments in Wales
Hospital buildings completed in 1920
NHS hospitals in Wales
Powys Teaching Health Board